Los Romeros, The Romero Guitar Quartet, is a guitar quartet, sometimes known as "The Royal Family of the Guitar" — their personnel consists entirely of members of the Romero family.

The quartet was founded in 1960 by Celedonio Romero, who grew up in Franco's Spain. He and his family emigrated to the United States in 1957. All three of his sons, Angel, Celin and Pepe, had made their performing debuts by the time they were seven. In 1957, the Romeros moved to the United States, where they continue to reside. In 1990 Angel left the quartet, and was replaced by Celin's son Celino. Celedonio Romero died in 1996, and was replaced by Angel's son Lito.

Members

The Romero Guitar Quartet 
 1960–90: Celedonio Romero, Celin Romero, Pepe Romero, Angel Romero
 1990–96: Celedonio Romero, Celin Romero, Pepe Romero, Celino Romero
 since 1996: Celin Romero, Pepe Romero, Celino Romero, Lito Romero

External links 
 
 Some photos of LP covers (Oviatt Library Digital Collections)
 The Romeros' family life - religious-themed article

Musical groups established in 1960
Classical guitar ensembles
Musical quartets
Mercury Records artists
Family musical groups
1960 establishments in the United States